Pluhův Žďár is a municipality and village in Jindřichův Hradec District in the South Bohemian Region of the Czech Republic. It has about 600 inhabitants.

Administrative parts

Villages of Červená Lhota, Jižná, Klenov, Mostečný, Plasná, Pohoří and Samosoly are administrative parts of Pluhův Žďár.

Geography
The northern part of the municipality with the Pluhův Žďár village lies in the Křemešník Highlands. The southern part lies in the Třeboň Basin. The territory is rich is small ponds.

History
The first written mention of Pluhův Žďár is from 1267, when a fortress owned by Pluh of Rabštejn was documented. Until the 15th century, the fortress and the village were owned by the Pluh of Žďár family, after which the village was named.

Sights
Pluhův Žďár is known for the Červená Lhota Castle.

Notable people
Carl Ditters von Dittersdorf (1739–1799), Austrian composer, violinist and silvologist; died here

References

External links

Villages in Jindřichův Hradec District